John Bartram High School is a public secondary school serving neighborhoods of the Southwest Philadelphia area of Philadelphia, Pennsylvania. The school, which serves grades 9 through 12, is a part of the School District of Philadelphia.

History
On February 5, 1939, John Bartram High School, located at the intersection of 67th Street and Elmwood Avenue in Southwest Philadelphia, opened for the first time to 1,700 students. The school was named after Philadelphian botanist John Bartram. It was built to relieve overcrowding at West Philadelphia High School due to population increases in the southwest part of the city. According to a history of the school published on its 50th anniversary, the school was originally planned to be built at 74th Street and Dicks Avenue, but the site was changed before construction started. 

It was one of the first Philadelphia high schools named for a prominent individual rather than a geographic region of the city.

On December 4, 1986, it was added to the National Register of Historic Places.

The school is home to PA-20032 Unit of the Air Force JROTC.

School and site structure

Structure
The building is one city block long and the capacity of the school is about 3000 students. The blueprint of the school shows that there are approximately 103 classrooms and 12 staircases. The school has a boys' and a girls' gymnasium for different sporting events. The auditorium can hold about 1077 people. The art-deco building was designed for 2,750 students but frequently held 3,200 or more.

Curriculum
John Bartram students must take four English classes to graduate. English classes are to help students improve their reading, grammar, writing skills, and vocabulary. Optional English classes include SAT English, AP English, Theater, Public Speaking, and AP English Literature.

Feeder Schools
 Joseph W. Catharine School
 Benjamin B. Comegys School
 William Longstreth School
 Thomas D. Morton School
 John M. Patterson School
 Penrose School
 William T. Tilden Middle School
 S. Weir Mitchell Elementary School

Notable alumni

 Joe Bryant (born 1954), basketball player who played in the NBA for the Philadelphia 76ers
 Solomon Burke (1936 or 1940–2010), musician
 Bernie Custis (1928–2017), football player
 Mary Jane Fonder (1942–2018), convicted murderer
 Tyrone Garland (born 1992), basketball player
 Wilson Goode (born 1938), former mayor of Philadelphia
 DJ Jazzy Jeff (born 1965), musician
 Patti LaBelle (born 1944), singer, actress
 David Martin (born 1959), former gridiron football cornerback who played in the National Football League, Canadian Football League and United States Football League
 Earl Monroe (born 1944), basketball player who played in the NBA for the New York Knicks.
 Connie Morgan (1935-1996), professional baseball player
 Ann A. Mullen (1935–1994), politician who served as mayor of Gloucester Township, New Jersey and represented New Jersey's 4th legislative district in the New Jersey General Assembly.
 Danny Rapp (1941–1983), Frank Maffei, Joe Terranova and David White (1939–2019), doo-wop group Danny & the Juniors
 Irvin "Bo" Roberson (1935–2001), football player, track athlete
 Al-Hajj Shabazz (born 1992), American football cornerback who played in the NFL for the Pittsburgh Steelers.
 Jimmy Wilkes (1925-2008), major league baseball outfielder in the Negro National League
 Erik Williams (born 1968), football player
 Frank Wolf (born 1939), Congressman for Virginia's 10th district

References

External links
 Bartram High School
 
 Pennsylvania State Department of Education

School District of Philadelphia
High schools in Philadelphia
School buildings on the National Register of Historic Places in Philadelphia
Public high schools in Pennsylvania
Educational institutions established in 1939
1939 establishments in Pennsylvania
Southwest Philadelphia